Dominik Andrijašević (1572–1639), was a Ragusan Franciscan friar who served as the Catholic Bishop of Skadar (Scutari) (1622–24) and later Mostar (1637).

Life
Born in 1572 in Orahov Do in Herzegovina, Andrijašević was a resident in Ragusa (Dubrovnik).

He was sent with Damjan Ljubibratić several times to the Popes with petitions of aid in Balkan uprisings.

In 1608, Andrijašević arrived in Ragusa (Dubrovnik) from Spain with letters for Grdan.

In 1624, the Ottomans expelled him from Scutari.

Legacy
Andrijašević was a member of the Andrijašević-Mrše family of the Slano region.

References

1572 births
1639 deaths
Ragusan clergy
Franciscan bishops
20th-century Roman Catholic bishops in Albania
17th-century diplomats
Ravno, Bosnia and Herzegovina
People from Dubrovnik
17th-century Roman Catholic bishops in the Ottoman Empire